Flusser is a surname. Notable people with the surname include:

Alan Flusser (born 1945), American writer and clothing designer
Charles W. Flusser (1832–1864) United States Navy officer
David Flusser (1917–2000), Israeli academic
Jan Flusser (*1962), Czech computer scientist and mathematician
Vilém Flusser (1920–1991), Czech-Brazilian Jewish philosopher, writer and journalist

de:Flusser